Melville Richard John Guest  (born 18 November 1943) is a British former diplomat and first-class cricketer.

He was born in what was then Salisbury, Southern Rhodesia, two weeks after the death of his father, Ernest Melville Charles Guest, a RAF pilot who was killed in action over the English Channel. He was educated at Rugby School and Magdalen College, Oxford, where he played cricket for the University from 1964–1966 and earned a Blue. In the Varsity Match of 1965, Guest and his fellow batsman Mike Groves were barracked by the crowd for slow scoring, with 15 consecutive maiden overs bowled by the two Cambridge spinners. He was elected President of Vincent's Club in 1966.

He entered the Foreign and Commonwealth Office (FCO) in 1966, with a first posting to Tokyo in 1967. After a tour of duty in Paris, he temporarily left the FCO and was managing director of Lucas France from 1980 to 1985. He was then a director of the Channel Tunnel Group before returning to the FCO in Tokyo in 1986 as commercial counsellor. His last overseas posting was as political counsellor and consul general in Stockholm. He returned to the UK as head of the South Pacific department and then head of the South East Asia department. He left the FCO to become chief executive of Asia House, during which time he also took the role of executive director of the UK-Korea Forum for the Future and of the UK-Japan 21st Century Group. He was also the secretary of the UK-India Round Table. He was a senior advisor for corporate and external affairs to Imperial College, London, 2005–13.

He was appointed OBE in the 2007 Queen's Birthday Honours for services to Britain's relations with Asia.

References

External links 
 Melville Guest at CricketArchive
 Melville Guest at ESPNcricinfo

1943 births
Living people
English cricketers
Officers of the Order of the British Empire
Oxford University cricketers
British diplomats
People educated at Rugby School
Alumni of Magdalen College, Oxford
Wiltshire cricketers